Table tennis competitions at the 2015 Pan American Games in Toronto were held from July 19 to 25 at the Markham Pan Am Centre (Atos Markham Pan Am Centre) in Markham. Due to naming rights, the arena was known as the latter for the duration of the games. A total of four table tennis events were held: two each for men and women.

The winners of each the individual events, provided they are not already qualified, qualified to compete at the 2016 Summer Olympics in Rio de Janeiro, Brazil.

Venue

The competitions took place at the Atos Markham Pan Am Centre (Markham Pan Am Centre) located in the city of Markham, about 31 kilometers from the athletes village. The arena had capacity of 2,000 people per session (1,000 permanent seating + 1,000 temporary seats). The venue also hosted badminton competitions earlier during the games. The venue also hosted the water polo competitions, but in the other side of the centre (an Olympic sized pool).

Competition schedule
The following is the competition schedule for the table tennis competitions:

Medal table

Medalists

Participating nations
A total of 16 countries qualified athletes. The number of athletes a nation has entered is in parentheses beside the name of the country.

Qualification

A total of 80 athletes (40 men and 40 women) qualified to compete at the games. A nation may enter a maximum of three athletes per gender. As host nation, Canada automatically qualified a full team of six athletes. All other athletes qualified at the qualification tournament in March 2015.

See also
Table tennis at the 2015 Parapan American Games
Table tennis at the 2016 Summer Olympics

References

 
Events at the 2015 Pan American Games
Pan American Games
2015
Table tennis competitions in Canada